The 2002–03 Arizona Wildcats men's basketball team represented the University of Arizona during the 2002–03 NCAA Division I men's basketball season.  Head coach Lute Olson led the team in his 20th season at Arizona.  The team played their home games at McKale Center in Tucson, Arizona as members of the Pacific-10 Conference.

The team earned the program's 10th Pacific-10 Conference championship with a record of 17–1 in conference play and 28–4 overall.

Roster

Schedule and results 

|-
!colspan=9 style="background:#; color:white;"| Regular season

|-
!colspan=9 style="background:#;"| Pacific-10 tournament

|-
!colspan=9 style="background:#;"| NCAA tournament

|-

NCAA Division I tournament 

 West
 Arizona (#1 seed) 80, Vermont 51
 Arizona 96, Gonzaga 95 (2OT)
 Arizona 88, Notre Dame 71
 Kansas 78, Arizona 75

Rankings

2003 NCAA Tournament
Arizona was invited to the NCAA tournament for the 19th-straight season, receiving the top seed in the West Region.  The team advanced to the Elite Eight by defeating (16-seed) Vermont, (9) Gonzaga, and (5) Notre Dame before falling 78-75 to (2) Kansas.

Awards
Jason Gardner
Consensus NCAA All-America Second Team
Pac-10 All-Conference Team
Luke Walton
Pac-10 All-Conference Team
Hassan Adams
Pac-10 All-Freshman Team
Andre Iguodala
Pac-10 All-Freshman Team
Lute Olson
Pac-10 Coach of the Year
Induction into the Naismith Memorial Basketball Hall of Fame (September 27, 2002)

References

External links
 Arizona Wildcats men's basketball official website

Arizona Wildcats men's basketball seasons
Arizona
Arizona Wildcats
Arizona Wildcats
Arizona